The 1954 Memphis State Tigers football team was an American football team that represented Memphis State College (now known as the University of Memphis) as an independent during the 1954 college football season. In their eighth season under head coach Ralph Hatley, Memphis State compiled a 3–4–3 record.

Schedule

References

Memphis State
Memphis Tigers football seasons
Memphis State Tigers football